Nettleship v Weston [1971] 2 QB 691 is an English Court of Appeal judgment dealing with the breach of duty in negligence claims. In this case the court had considered the question of the standard of care that should be applied to a learner driver, and whether it should be the same as is expected of an experienced driver.

Facts
Mr. Nettleship, the plaintiff (claimant), agreed to teach Mrs Weston, the defendant, to drive in her husband’s car, after he had inquired the insurance policy. During one of the lessons, the defendant lost control of the car and caused an accident in which the plaintiff was injured. The defendant argued that the plaintiff was well aware of her lack of skill and that the court should make allowance for her since she could not be expected to drive like an experienced motorist.

Judgment
The Court of Appeal, consisting of Lord Denning MR, Salmon LJ and Megaw LJ held that applying a lower standard to the learner driver because the instructor was aware of her inexperience would result in complicated shifting standards. It would imply, for example, that an inexperienced doctor owed his patient a lower standard of care if the patient was aware of his lack of experience. The standard of care for a learner driver would be the usual standard applied to drivers: that of an experienced and skilled driver. The policy consideration that played a role in this decision was that the learner driver was covered by insurance.It is essential to consider an objective standard while dealing with a case of negligence. The court took different fields of law into consideration while concluding the matter of Nettleship and Weston.

Over the dissent of Salmon LJ, the Court of Appeal held that the instructor was also responsible for the accident as he was partially in control of the car and should only be able to recover half of his damages due to contributory negligence.

See also
 Duty of care in English law
 Breach of duty in English law
Wilsher v Essex Area Health Authority

Legislation
Civil Evidence Act 1968 (c.64)
Employers' Liability Act 1880
Occupiers' Liability Act 1957 (c.31) s 2, s 2(4)
Road Traffic Act 1960
Road Traffic Act 1930 (c.43) s 12
Rules of the Supreme Court (Revision) 1965 (SI 1965 1776) para 7

Notes

English tort case law
Lord Denning cases
1971 in British law
Court of Appeal (England and Wales) cases
1971 in case law